Delplanqueia inscriptella is a species of moth in the family Pyralidae. It was described by Philogène Auguste Joseph Duponchel in 1836. It is found in France, Spain, the United Kingdom and Malta.

References

Phycitini
Moths described in 1836
Moths of Europe
Taxa named by Philogène Auguste Joseph Duponchel